Falmouth Airpark  is a public-use airport and residential airpark located four miles (6 km) northeast of the central business district of Falmouth, in Barnstable County, Massachusetts, United States. It is privately owned by Falmouth Airpark Homeowners Association. The airport grew to supersede the Coonamessett Airport which was located in close proximity to the Otis Air National Guard Base and closed in the 1960s.

Facilities and aircraft 

For a 12-month period ending April 21, 2016, the airport averaged 39 operations a week: 61% local general aviation, 37% transient general aviation, 1% military, and 1% air taxi. During that same time there were 55 aircraft based on the field: 50 single engine, and 5 multi-engine aircraft.

Accidents and Incidents
On December 2, 2022, a Mooney M20J-201 (N3515H) crashed on approach to Falmouth Airpark. The 83-year-old pilot was killed; his passenger survived with injuries.

References

External links 
Falmouth Airpark, official web site
Aerial photo of the airport in 1960 with a grass runway
Aerial photo of the airport in 1968 with a paved runway

Residential airparks
Airports in Barnstable County, Massachusetts